Paung Township is a township of Thaton District in the Mon State of Myanmar.

Townships of Mon State